Events in the year 1992 in Japan.  It corresponds to Heisei 4 (平成4年) in the Japanese calendar.

Incumbents
 Emperor: Akihito
 Prime Minister: Kiichi Miyazawa (L–Hiroshima)
 Chief Cabinet Secretary: Kōichi Katō (L–Yamagata) until December 12, Yōhei Kōno (L–Kanagawa)
 Chief Justice of the Supreme Court: Ryōhachi Kusaba
 President of the House of Representatives: Yoshio Sakurauchi (L–Shimane)
 President of the House of Councillors: Yūji Osada (L–proportional) until July 9, Bunbē Hara (L–Tokyo) from August 7
 Diet sessions: 123rd (regular, January 24 to June 21), 124th (extraordinary, August 7 to August 11), 125th (extraordinary, October 30 to December 10)

Governors
Aichi Prefecture: Reiji Suzuki 
Akita Prefecture: Kikuji Sasaki 
Aomori Prefecture: Masaya Kitamura 
Chiba Prefecture: Takeshi Numata 
Ehime Prefecture: Sadayuki Iga 
Fukui Prefecture: Yukio Kurita
Fukuoka Prefecture: Hachiji Okuda 
Fukushima Prefecture: Eisaku Satō
Gifu Prefecture: Taku Kajiwara 
Gunma Prefecture: Hiroyuki Kodera 
Hiroshima Prefecture: Toranosuke Takeshita 
Hokkaido: Takahiro Yokomichi 
Hyogo Prefecture: Toshitami Kaihara 
Ibaraki Prefecture: Fujio Takeuchi 
Ishikawa Prefecture: Yōichi Nakanishi 
Iwate Prefecture: Iwao Kudō 
Kagawa Prefecture: Jōichi Hirai 
Kagoshima Prefecture: Yoshiteru Tsuchiya 
Kanagawa Prefecture: Kazuji Nagasu 
Kochi Prefecture: Daijiro Hashimoto 
Kumamoto Prefecture: Joji Fukushima 
Kyoto Prefecture: Teiichi Aramaki 
Mie Prefecture: Ryōzō Tagawa 
Miyagi Prefecture: Shuntarō Honma 
Miyazaki Prefecture: Suketaka Matsukata 
Nagano Prefecture: Gorō Yoshimura 
Nagasaki Prefecture: Isamu Takada 
Nara Prefecture: Yoshiya Kakimoto
Niigata Prefecture: Kiyoshi Kaneko (until 9 September); Ikuo Hirayama (starting 25 October)
Oita Prefecture: Morihiko Hiramatsu 
Okayama Prefecture: Shiro Nagano 
Okinawa Prefecture: Masahide Ōta
Osaka Prefecture: Kazuo Nakagawa 
Saga Prefecture: Isamu Imoto 
Saitama Prefecture: Yawara Hata (until 12 July); Yoshihiko Tsuchiya (starting 12 July)
Shiga Prefecture: Minoru Inaba 
Shiname Prefecture: Nobuyoshi Sumita 
Shizuoka Prefecture: Shigeyoshi Saitō 
Tochigi Prefecture: Fumio Watanabe
Tokushima Prefecture: Shinzo Miki 
Tokyo: Shun'ichi Suzuki 
Tottori Prefecture: Yuji Nishio 
Toyama Prefecture: Yutaka Nakaoki
Wakayama Prefecture: Shirō Kariya  
Yamagata Prefecture: Seiichirō Itagaki 
Yamaguchi Prefecture: Toru Hirai 
Yamanashi Prefecture: Ken Amano

Events
 January 8: US President George H. W. Bush vomits in Prime Minister Miyazawa's lap during a state dinner.
 January 12: According to Japan Coast Guard official confirmed report, a settlement ship Fukujin-maru, carrying 46 passengers and crew, capsizes off Shimonoseki, Yamaguchi Prefecture, 37 persons were rescued, 9 persons were their lost to lives. 
 January 13: Japan apologizes for forcing Korean women into sexual slavery during World War II.
 March 7: Sailor Moon began broadcasting on TV Asahi.
 March 14: Nozomi services begin on the Tokaido Shinkansen.
 March 25: Huis ten Bosch opens in Nagasaki Prefecture.
 April 1
Chiba City is divided into wards.
 Taiyo Kobe Mitsui Bank renames itself to Sakura Bank.
 April 27: Kirby's Dream Land, the first video game in the Kirby series by Nintendo and HAL Laboratory and the debut of Kirby himself, is released.
 May 2: Civil servants are granted a two-day weekend for the first time.
 May 22: Japan New Party founded.
 July 1: Yamagata Shinkansen opens.
 July 26: In Upper House elections, the LDP holds on to a slim coalition majority.
 October 14: Liberal Democratic Party member Shin Kanemaru resigns over the receipt of illegal payments from Sagawa Express.
 October 23: Emperor Akihito visits the People's Republic of China for the first time.
 October 29–November 8: Finals of the 1992 AFC Asian Cup held in Japan. The Japan national football team defeat the defending champions, Saudi Arabia, in the final in Hiroshima.

Births

January 6: Hiroya, kickboxer
January 12: Mao Kobayashi, idol
February 1: Mao Ichimichi, actress
February 7: Maimi Yajima, singer
February 26: Ai Shinozaki, gravure idol and singer
March 6: Momoko Tsugunaga, singer
March 11: Nao Tōyama, voice actress and singer
March 21: Erena Mizusawa, model and actress
March 25: Machico, singer and voice actress 
March 27: Aoi Yūki, voice actress
April 13: Daichi Hashimoto, professional wrestler
April 25: Kyosuke Ikeda, actor and voice actor
May 1: You Kikkawa, singer
May 22: Chinami Tokunaga, J-pop singer
May 28: Gaku Shibasaki, footballer
June 27: Tsubasa Honda, actress and model
July 3: Maasa Sudo, singer
July 12: Anna Ishibashi, model and actress
July 15: 
Hokutōfuji Daiki, sumo wrestler
Koharu Kusumi, J-pop singer, voice actress, and model
July 16: Tetsuto Yamada, baseball player
August 5: Yasutaka Uchiyama, tennis player
August 6: Saori Ōnishi, voice actress
August 10: Ari Ozawa, voice actress
August 16: Zawachin, model
August 18: Riko Narumi, actress and model
August 20: Mai Shiraishi, idol singer and model
August 23: Yuka Kono, figure skater
August 25: Miyabi Natsuyaki, singer
August 27
Ayame Goriki, actress, singer and model
Sayuri Matsumura, idol singer, model 
September 3: Sachie Ishizu, tennis player
September 7: Suzuka Morita, model and actress
September 28: Koko Tsurumi, artistic gymnast
October 2: Yasuaki Yamasaki, professional baseball player
October 3: Aina Hashimoto, singer, actress and voice actress
October 4: Shun Miyazato, actor and voice actor
October 5: Hirotaka Chiba, actor and voice actor
October 19: Shiho, actress and model
October 27: Taiko Katono, actor and model
November 5: Takuya Kai, baseball player
November 15: Minami Minegishi, singer and actress
November 20: Maiha Ishimura, singer
November 25: Haru Nomura, golfer
December 8: Yui Yokoyama, singer and actress
December 14: Ryo Miyaichi, footballer
December 20: Shuta Tonosaki, professional baseball player
December 22: Shiori Kutsuna, actress and idol

Deaths

 April 25: Yutaka Ozaki, songwriter and rock star (b. 1965)
 May 11: Taku Izumi, composer (b. 1930) 
 May 22: Lee Yangji, author (b. 1955)
 May 24: Hitoshi Ogawa, racing car driver (b. 1956)
 May 27: Machiko Hasegawa, illustrator (b. 1920)
 May 29: Yoshitoshi Mori, artist (b. 1898)
 June 8: Sakae Ōba, officer of the Imperial Japanese Army  (b. 1914)
 June 10: Hachidai Nakamura, composer (b. 1931)
 July 5: Toshirō Oumi, singer, composer (b. 1918)
 August 4: Seicho Matsumoto, author (b. 1909)
 August 12: Kenji Nakagami, author (b. 1946)
 September 5: Yasuji Mori, animator (b. 1925)
 September 25: Kazuko Matsuo, singer (b. 1935)

Statistics
Yen value: US$1 = ¥111.85 (December 31)

See also
 1992 in Japanese television
 List of Japanese films of 1992

References

 
Years of the 20th century in Japan
Japan